Lake Drīdzis (Dreidzs in local dialect) is the deepest lake in Latvia with a maximum depth of 66.2 meters. Its depth was originally measured at 65.1 meters in 1998, but it was measured again at 63.1. However, the University of Daugavpils measured it in 2020 at its final depth of 66.2 meters. The lake's bed is sandy and silty.

The lake is nearby the Lake Drīdzis Nature Park, which has been protected since 1977.

References

Dridzis